The LG KF510 is a GSM mobile phone from LG Electronics which debuted in the 1st quarter of 2008. 

Measuring 11mm (.43"), the KF510 sports a metal frame and tempered glass display.

Specifications 

Design Dimension: 104.5 x 49.5 x 10.9 mm 
Main Display: 2.2" QVGA, 240x320 pixels
Audio 
Camera features 3 MP, autofocus,  flash
Messaging/SMS, EMS, MMS, Email
Java 2.0
WAP 2.0
Memory card slot/microSD 
Call Records 
藍牙 TM
USB 
Data cable support 
Browser 
Vibration 
Ringtones/Polyphonic
Radio /FM Radio
MP3 Player 
Audio playback formats 
Integrated speakers
HF speakerphone 
Battery 
Talk time
Standby time  
Navigation

References

KF510
Mobile phones introduced in 2008